Gastineau Girls is an American reality series that made its debut on the E! cable channel in 2005. The show followed the daily exploits of Lisa Gastineau and Brittny Gastineau, respectively the ex-wife and only daughter (whom he has not seen in 17 years) of former NFL player Mark Gastineau.

Synopsis
The first season chronicled Lisa and Brittny's quest for love in New York City as well as Brittny's attempt to make it in the world of modeling.  After its initial season ended, E! renewed the show for a second season. After airing two seasons, the show was cancelled.

The series was produced by True Entertainment, a subsidiary of Endemol Entertainment, known for CBS' Big Brother.

Episodes

Season 1

Season 2

DVD release
On January 31, 2006, the series' first complete season was released on Region 1 DVD in the United States.

Awards and nominations

External links
 

2000s American reality television series
2005 American television series debuts
2006 American television series endings
E! original programming
English-language television shows
Television series by Endemol
Television shows set in New York City
Women in New York City